Blackham Coliseum is a multipurpose arena in Lafayette, Louisiana.  It was built on the University of Louisiana at Lafayette campus in 1949 as the home to the then-named SLI Bulldogs, now called the Louisiana Ragin' Cajuns men's basketball teams. The arena was named for Stafford Morgan Blackham, former dean of the Department of Animal Husbandry at SLI, and as such it was built to host livestock exhibitions as well as athletics (in a similar manner to the usage of LSU's Parker Coliseum).  It replaced the 1,500-seat Earl K. Long Gymnasium as home to the athletics teams.  It remained the home for the men's team until the Cajundome was completed in 1984. The women continue to play the majority of their games at Earl K. Long. Blackham hosted the Southland Conference men's basketball tournament in 1982.

In the 1960s, it became popular as a venue for pop concerts where acts like The Supremes, James Brown and Jackie Wilson. The Supremes played to soldout audiences on their "Symphony Tour 1965".

Today it is still in use, seating 5,500 for basketball and up to 9,800 for concerts.  It also features 25,000 square feet (2,300 m2) of space at the main arena, with two barns adding 46,500 square feet (4,300 m2) of space.  Altogether, the three buildings can also be used for trade shows, rodeos and conventions.  It was home to the Acadiana Mudbugs of the Southern Indoor Football League for their 2009 season, and in fall 2009, the revived Louisiana IceGators began play there as a member of the Southern Professional Hockey League.

In April 2009, the venue held its first heavy metal concert, the 2009 No Fear Music Tour featuring Lamb Of God, As I Lay Dying, Children of Bodom, God Forbid and Municipal Waste.

The venue serves as home to the Grammy-styled, annual Le Cajun Music Awards Festival held every August by the Cajun French Music Association, an association of Cajun music enthusiasts for the preservation of the Cajun music, language, heritage and culture.

See also
 List of convention centers in the United States

References

External links
 Lafayette Convention and Visitors Commission - Blackham Coliseum

Basketball venues in Louisiana
College basketball venues in the United States
Convention centers in Louisiana
Equestrian venues in the United States
Indoor ice hockey venues in the United States
Indoor arenas in Louisiana
Louisiana Ragin' Cajuns basketball
Louisiana Ragin' Cajuns women's basketball
Rodeo venues in the United States
Sports venues in Lafayette, Louisiana
Sports venues in Louisiana
Buildings and structures in Lafayette, Louisiana
1950 establishments in Louisiana
Sports venues completed in 1950